99 and 44/100% Dead! is a 1974 American action comedy film directed by John Frankenheimer and starring Richard Harris. The title is a play on an advertising slogan for Ivory soap.

Plot
Harry Crown, a stylish professional hit man with a pair of Browning Hi-Power 9mm pistols with ivory grips, carried in a shoulder holster, is brought in by mob boss "Uncle Frank" Kelly when his operation is challenged by Big Eddie, a grinning, lisping rival.

Crown is caught in the crossfire, as is his romantic interest, Buffy, a third-grade schoolteacher. In his attempt to take over the rackets, Big Eddie has hired Marvin "The Claw" Zuckerman, a sadistic one-armed killer with a prosthetic attachment that includes machine guns and knives.

Buffy is abducted, causing Harry to ignore Uncle Frank's warnings not to take on Eddie's men in broad daylight. A showdown in a warehouse results in The Claw being overpowered and literally disarmed. Harry appears to be too late to save Buffy, but a gunshot rings out and Big Eddie falls to the ground, slain by Uncle Frank.

Cast

 Richard Harris as Harry Crown
 Edmond O'Brien as Uncle Frank Kelly
 Bradford Dillman as Big Eddie
 Chuck Connors as Marvin 'Claw' Zuckerman
 Ann Turkel as Buffy
 Constance Ford as Dolly
 David Hall as Tony
 Kathrine Baumann as Baby
 Janis Heiden as Clara
 Max Kleven as North
 Karl Lukas as Guard
 Tony Brubaker as Burt (as Anthony Brubaker)
 Jerry Summers as Shoes
 Roy Jenson as Jake

Release
The film began production in 1969 with Sergio Leone directing and Marcello Mastroianni and Charles Bronson starring.

Principal photography began on August 10, 1973, in Seattle before moving to Los Angeles.

Frankenheimer later described the film as "a bit off center":
It's like 1970s pop art, the idea being, quickly, that our society is so violent that the person best qualified to cope with it is the professional killer. I hope what happens won't be what happened with The Manchurian Candidate — horrible reviews and then five years later it's on everyone's list. I don't want that to happen again.

In an interview two decades later, Frankenheimer himself thought the film a failure. He felt that he did not do his best work on it and in hindsight, shouldn't do this sort of satire.

On December 13, 2011 Shout! Factory released the film on DVD as part of a double feature with The Nickel Ride.

See also
 List of American films of 1974
 Richard Harris filmography

References

External links

 
 
 

1974 films
1974 comedy films
1970s action comedy films
1970s crime comedy films
1970s English-language films
20th Century Fox films
American action comedy films
American crime comedy films
Films scored by Henry Mancini
Films directed by John Frankenheimer
Films shot in Florida
Films shot in Washington (state)
American neo-noir films
American gangster films
Films shot in Seattle
Films shot in Los Angeles
1970s American films